Jordi Pablo Ripollés (born 1 January 1990) is a Spanish former footballer who played as a right midfielder, and the current assistant manager of La Roda CF.

Having started out at Villarreal and excelling for Spain at youth level, his senior career was blighted by injuries.

Club career
Born in Vinaròs, Province of Castellón, Jordi Pablo began his career with local Vinaròs CF, joining Villarreal CF's youth system at the age of 8. He made his debut for the first team of the latter in April 2009, appearing in two consecutive defeats: 0–2 at home against Málaga CF for La Liga and 0–3 at Arsenal in the UEFA Champions League– this was due to the injury of Santi Cazorla, lost for the season also in that month. 

In late July 2009, Jordi Pablo joined Málaga on a four-year deal, with Villarreal retaining a rebuying option in the first three. Late into preseason he suffered a severe knee injury against Levante UD, going on to miss the entire 2009–10.

On 17 August 2010, Jordi Pablo was loaned to FC Cartagena in the second division. However, in the Murcian team's first pre-season match, he injured his right leg, being sidelined for the first months of the new campaign and again failing to play in any competitive games.

On 1 August 2011, Málaga cancelled Jordi Pablo's contract. He immediately returned to Villarreal's reserves, in the second level; on 22 October 2011 he made his first appearance since 26 April 2009, playing the last 29 minutes against Real Murcia in a 1–3 away defeat.

Jordi Pablo all but competed in division three in the following years, his only season in the second tier being spent with CD Mirandés in 2014–15 as that club was reinstated following Murcia's relegation due to financial irregularities. In August 2016, following a thigh injury while playing for La Roda CF, the 26-year-old retired from football but, as he still was under contract, was immediately named their assistant coach.

International career
Jordi Pablo played for Spain's under-17 at the 2007 FIFA World Cup held in South Korea, helping the nation to a final runner-up spot after a penalty shootout loss to Nigeria. After his performances (three goals, four matches), he was promoted to the under-19s.

References

External links

1990 births
Living people
People from Vinaròs
Sportspeople from the Province of Castellón
Spanish footballers
Footballers from the Valencian Community
Association football midfielders
La Liga players
Segunda División players
Segunda División B players
Tercera División players
Villarreal CF B players
Villarreal CF C players
Villarreal CF players
Málaga CF players
FC Cartagena footballers
Atlético Madrid B players
La Roda CF players
CD Mirandés footballers
Spain youth international footballers